Tongxin County (Xiao'erjing: طْوثٍ ثِيًا) is a county under the administration of the prefecture-level city of Wuzhong in the central part of the Ningxia Hui Autonomous Region of the People's Republic of China, bordering Gansu province to the east. It has a total area of 7,021 square kilometers with a population of approximately 360,000 people.

Characteristics

Due to its topography, Tongxin County's economic conditions and foundation are extremely poor, and the county is often stricken by drought. However, farmers still make up two-thirds of the county's population. The county government has sought to use high technological methods to improve the standard of living in the region. The county government is located in the town of Tongxin.

History

In his Red Star Over China, Edgar Snow mentions visiting the small towns of Yuwang Bao and Yuwang located in today's Tongxin County. At the moment (summer/fall 1936), Yuwang Bao was the location of  the headquarters of the First Front Red Army, where Edgar Snow met with the army's commander, Peng Dehuai there. Edgar Snow described Yuwang Bao as follows:
On the high, stout walls of Yu Wang Pao a squad of Red buglers was practicing, and from a corner of this fortlike city flew a big scarlet flag, its yellow hammer and ciskle cracking out in the breeze... We could look down on one side to a clean courtyard, where Muslim women were hulling rice and baking. Washing hung from a line on another side. In a distant square some Red soldiers were practicing wall scaling, broad jumping, and grenade throwing.

Yuwang (40 li north-west of Yuwang Bao), recently captured by the Reds from the troops of Ma Hongkui after a ten-day siege, was described as
an ancient Muslim city of four or five hundred families, with a magnificent wall of stone and brick. Outside of the wall was a Muslim mosque, with its own wall of beautiful glazed brick unscarred. But other buildings showed signs of the siege this city had undergone before it was taken by the Reds.

In October 1936, a public meeting was held at the Tongxin Great Mosque, establishing  the Yuwang Hui Autonomous Government - the first autonomous county in Communist China. Although this autonomous unit was short-lived, the  mosque building was protected as a revolutionary historical site, and became the only major Islamic building in Ningxia to survive destruction during the Cultural Revolution.

Administrative divisions
Tongxin County has 7 towns and 4 townships.
Towns
 Yuhai
 Dingtang
 Wangtuan
 Xiamaguan
 Weizhou
 Hexi
 Yuwang

Townships
 Xinglong
 Magaozhuang
 Tianlaozhuang
 Zhangjiayuan

Demographics
According to the regional census of 1983, Tongxin County had the second-highest percentage of the Hui (Muslim Chinese) people in its population among all counties in Ningxia, second only to Jingyuan County. 79.0% of its population at the time (172,906 out of 218,967) were Hui.

Climate

References

Bibliography 
 Dru C. Gladney, Muslim Chinese: Ethnic Nationalism in the People's Republic. 1st ed.: Harvard University Press, 1991, ; 2nd ed., 1996. .

County-level divisions of Ningxia
Wuzhong, Ningxia